17035 Velichko, provisional designation , is a Vestian asteroid from the inner regions of the asteroid belt, approximately 4.5 kilometers in diameter.

It was discovered on 22 March 1999, by LONEOS program at Lowell's Anderson Mesa Station near Flagstaff, Arizona, United States. The asteroid was named after Ukrainian astronomer Fedor Velichko.

Orbit and classification 

Velichko is a core member of the Vesta family, thought to have originated from the Rheasilvia crater, a large impact crater on the south-polar surface of 4 Vesta, which is the main-belt's second-most-massive asteroid after 1 Ceres.

It orbits the Sun in the inner main-belt at a distance of 2.1–2.8 AU once every 3 years and 10 months (1,395 days). Its orbit has an eccentricity of 0.15 and an inclination of 6° with respect to the ecliptic.

Physical characteristics 

Velichko has been characterized as a bright  V-type asteroid by Pan-STARRS photometric survey.

Rotation period 

Two photometric lightcurves of Velichko were obtained by French astronomer René Roy at the Blauvac Observatory in France, and by astronomers at the Palomar Transient Factory in California.

Diameter and albedo 

According to the survey carried out by the NEOWISE mission of NASA's space-based Wide-field Infrared Survey Explorer, Velichko has a diameter of 4.8 kilometers and an albedo of 0.28. The Collaborative Asteroid Lightcurve Link assumes a much higher albedo of 0.40, which is typical value for the bright stony surface of Vestian asteroids, and calculates a shorter diameter of 4.2 kilometers.

Naming 

This minor planet was named after Ukrainian astronomer Fedor P. Velichko (1957–2013), who was a senior scientist at the Institute of Astronomy of the Ukrainian National University of Kharkiv, and director of the University's Chuguev Observing Station, also known as the Chuguevskaya Station. He was an expert on the photometry and polarimetry of small Solar System bodies. The official naming citation was published by the Minor Planet Center on 21 July 2005.

References

External links 
 Feodor P. Velichko (17.01.1957 – 01.10.2013) , Institute of Astronomy Kharkiv National University
 Asteroid Lightcurve Database (LCDB), query form (info )
 Dictionary of Minor Planet Names, Google books
 Asteroids and comets rotation curves, CdR – Observatoire de Genève, Raoul Behrend
 Discovery Circumstances: Numbered Minor Planets (15001)-(20000) – Minor Planet Center
 
 

017035
017035
Named minor planets
017035
19990322